How Could You Do This To Me, Mum? is a young adult novel by Rosie Rushton. It is the third part of her Leehampton series. It was first published in 1996 by Piccadilly Press.

Plot summary 
Chelsea's parents don't want their daughter to have a birthday party, because it will be too expensive. Chelsea becomes jealous of her siblings Geneva and Warwick, who receive more money from their parents. Chelsea befriends Bex in the Stomping Ground nightclub. A few weeks later, their friendship is cemented after Fee's friend Eddie tries to assault Chelsea, and Bex comes to her aid. Barry Gee buys his own restaurant, which will be called Gee Whizz, after its owners, Barry Gee and Will Zetland.

Jemma wants to be an actress, but her parents aren't happy when she neglects her schoolwork to attend acting and dancing lessons. Jemma ignores them, and trusts Ms. Olivia Ockley, the owner of the acting school, who praises her talent. However, Jemma is annoyed when Alexa Browning receives a lead role instead of her. Jemma also dates Rob, which causes friction between her and Chelsea, although they reconcile after Chelsea's encounter with Eddie.

Jon wants to date Sumitha, but she is no longer interested. Jon is annoyed by his parents, who have little time for him. However, after Laura is injured in front of him at one of his mother's animal rights demonstrations, he realises that he likes her and asks her out.

Laura's mother is pregnant, and her boyfriend Melvyn objects to Laura spending time at demos with her neighbour Daniel. Laura's brother is born prematurely, and at Laura's suggestion is named Charlie.

Sumitha becomes a swot when she develops a crush on her new science teacher, Paul Sharpe. At the end of the term she tells him about her feelings, but learns that Paul is engaged to Mrs. McConnell. Sumitha is dismissive when Sandeep asks her to come back home with him, and feels bad after learning that he is being bullied by Kevin and Matthew.

Characters 
Chelsea Gee - Laura's best friend. Her mother is an agony aunt for teenagers and she writes articles for The Echo (a local newspaper).  Chelsea is very pretty and wants to be a vet. Chelsea is playing truant with new friend Bex Bayliss.
Laura Turnbull - Chelsea's best friend. She's got red hair and green eyes. Laura wants to be a writer. She hates Melvyn (her mother's partner)  and Betsy (her father's partner), because she wants her parents to live together. She's in love with Jon, and they begin dating after she is injured at an animal rights demonstration.
Jemma Farrant - A new girl in Lee Hill. She was wearing jumpers with bears to school, because her mother said so. Now she's got fashionable clothes, but she can't make her mum stop calling her "petal".
Sumitha Banerji - A girl from India. Her family comes from Kolkata in West Bengal district. Sumitha falls in love with the new science teacher. 
Jonathan "Jon" Joseph - A talented student of Bellborough Court. He hates his school, because he likes drawing and painting (he's got talent for it) and in Bellborough Court he can't study art. He wants to go to Lee Hill, where he can study art. He's in love with Sumitha, but when Laura is hurt in a demo, he realises that she is important to him. 
Ginny Gee - Chelsea's mum. She's an agony aunt for teenagers and journalist for The Echo. 
Barry Gee - Chelsea's dad. He sells soup and wants to have his own restaurant. 
Ruth Turnbull - Laura's mum. She is pregnant and is dating Melvyn. 
Peter Turnbull - Laura's dad. He lives with his girlfriend Betsy, and is an alcoholic.
Claire Farrant - Jemma's mum. She is not ready for Jemma to grow up, dressing her daughter in jumpers with little bears and calling her "petal" in public.
Andrew Farrant - Jemma's dad. 
Chitrita Banerji - Sumitha's mum. She teaches English to women from India.
Rajiv Banerji - Sumitha's dad. 
Sandeep Banerji - Sumitha's little brother. He had problems with Matthew and Kevin, who wanted him to pay them money.
Anona Joseph - Jon's mum. She studies art.
Henry Joseph - Jon's dad. He wants Jon to study in Cambridge.
Melvyn McCrouch - Ruth Turnbull's partner. 
Betsy – Peter Turnbull's partner. 
Rob Antell - Jemma's boyfriend, best friends with Jon.
Will Zetland - A man who offers Barry Gee a restaurant, which is to be called Gee Whizz on Chelsea's suggestion. 
Bex Bayliss - Chelsea's new friend.

British young adult novels
1996 British novels
Novels by Rosie Rushton